Leonard Tasman Norman (9 October 1885 – 20 October 1944) was an Australian rules footballer who played with Melbourne in the Victorian Football League (VFL).

Notes

External links 

1885 births
Australian rules footballers from Tasmania
Melbourne Football Club players
City-South Football Club players
1944 deaths